Michelle Emma May Elizabeth Donelan (born 8 April 1984) is a British politician serving as Secretary of State for Science, Innovation and Technology since 7 February 2023. She previously served in the Johnson government as Minister of State for Higher and Further Education from 2020 to 2022 and as Secretary of State for Education for two days during the July 2022 government crisis. She also served under Liz Truss and Rishi Sunak as Secretary of State for Digital, Culture, Media and Sport from September 2022 to February 2023. A member of the Conservative Party, she has been Member of Parliament (MP) for Chippenham in Wiltshire since 2015.

Early life and education
Michelle Emma May Elizabeth Donelan was born in April 1984 and grew up in Whitley, Cheshire. At the age of 15, Donelan spoke at the Conservative Party Conference in Blackpool, having decided to be a politician at the age of six. 

Donelan was educated at The County High School, Leftwich, before graduating from the University of York with a Bachelor of Arts degree in history and politics. While at university, she was involved in York Student Television.

Career 

Before the election of 2015, Donelan's career outside politics was in marketing, including a time working on Marie Claire magazine and for World Wrestling Entertainment (WWE). She subsequently stood for parliament at the 2010 general election in the safe Labour seat of Wentworth and Dearne in South Yorkshire, receiving 7,396 votes (17.6%) to Labour MP John Healey's 21,316 (50.6%). She was then selected as the prospective parliamentary candidate for Chippenham in February 2013. In Wiltshire, the constituency includes the market towns of Bradford on Avon, Chippenham, Corsham and Melksham, and the surrounding rural areas.

After her selection at Chippenham, she became a trustee of Help Victims of Domestic Violence, a charitable organisation based in the town and a member of the Steering Group of Wiltshire Carers. She defeated incumbent Liberal Democrat member Duncan Hames with 26,354 votes (47.6%) to 16,278 (29.4%). Donelan served on the Education Select Committee between 2015 and 2018.

Before the 2016 referendum, Donelan supported the UK remaining within the European Union. In June 2017, Donelan was re-elected as MP for Chippenham with 31,267 votes (54.7%), a majority of 16,630 over the 14,637 Liberal Democrat candidate (25.6%).

In the December 2019 general election, Donelan was re-elected with 30,994 votes (54.3%), a majority of 11,288 over the 19,706 Liberal Democrat votes (34.5%).

Junior Education Minister 
Donelan was appointed an assistant whip in 2018 and a government whip in July 2019. In September 2019, she was appointed parliamentary under-secretary for children to cover maternity leave for Kemi Badenoch.

In the February 2020 cabinet reshuffle, she became Minister of State for Universities. , her responsibilities included universities and co-chairing the Family Justice Board, which oversees the performance of the family justice system and is advised by the Family Justice Council.

In the 2021 cabinet reshuffle, her role was renamed Minister of State for Higher and Further Education, with the added right to attend cabinet. She was also sworn into the Privy Council.

Donelan initially backed Nadhim Zahawi in the July-September 2022 Conservative Party leadership election, switching her endorsement to Liz Truss after Zahawi was eliminated from the race. After Truss resigned, she endorsed Rishi Sunak in the October 2022 leadership election.

Secretary of State for Education
On 5 July 2022, in the wake of a large number of resignations from the second Johnson ministry over Boris Johnson's handling of the Chris Pincher scandal and other political scandals, Donelan, who was then serving as Parliamentary Under-Secretary of State for Skills, Further and Higher Education (previously named Minister of State for Higher and Further Education during her tenure) was promoted to Secretary of State for Education, after her predecessor Nadhim Zahawi was appointed Chancellor of the Exchequer.

On 7 July 2022, after less than 36 hours in the role, Donelan resigned as Secretary of State, writing that Johnson had "put us in an impossible position". She was the shortest-serving cabinet member in British history, her tenure being shorter than Earl Temple's four-day tenure as Foreign Secretary in 1783. Following reports she would receive severance pay at Secretary of State level despite her short tenure, Donelan refused this payment.

Secretary of State for Digital, Culture, Media and Sport

Donelan was appointed Secretary of State for Digital, Culture, Media and Sport on 7 September 2022 by then prime minister Liz Truss. Rishi Sunak succeeded Truss following the October 2022 Conservative Party leadership election, and Donelan retained her position in the cabinet.

On 14 December 2022, she announced that she would be taking maternity leave in 2023.

She stated in January 2023 that she was against returning the Parthenon marbles to Greece, on the grounds that restitution would "open a can of worms" and be a "dangerous road to go down."

Secretary of State for Science, Innovation and Technology
In a reshuffle of Sunak's cabinet on 7 February 2023, Donelan was appointed to the newly created role of Secretary of State for Science, Innovation and Technology.

Personal life
Donelan's partner, Tom Turner, is Commercial Head at his family-owned business Stronghold Global; they supplied government bodies including the Department of Health and Social Care with Personal Protective Equipment.

Donelan is a Christian.

Honours
She was appointed a member of the Privy Council on 20 September 2021 at Balmoral Castle.

Notes

References

External links
 

(Known as Minister of State for Universities 2020–2021)

1984 births
21st-century English women politicians
Alumni of the University of York
British Secretaries of State for Education
Conservative Party (UK) MPs for English constituencies
Female members of the Cabinet of the United Kingdom
Female members of the Parliament of the United Kingdom for English constituencies
Living people
Members of the Parliament of the United Kingdom for Chippenham
Members of the Privy Council of the United Kingdom
Ministers for Universities (United Kingdom)
People from Cheshire
People from Chippenham
UK MPs 2015–2017
UK MPs 2017–2019
UK MPs 2019–present